The Edmonton Rush are a lacrosse team based in Edmonton playing in the National Lacrosse League (NLL). The 2015 season is the 10th in franchise history. After an 0-2 start to the season, the Rush picked up where they left off in 2014, winning 13 of their last 16 games to win the West division. They then defeated the Calgary Roughnecks in the division finals, winning game 1 of the 2-game series followed by the tie-breaker. The Rush then beat the Toronto Rock two games to none in the finals, winning their first-ever NLL Championship.

2015 was the final season in Edmonton for the Rush, as they moved to Saskatchewan after the season ended.

Regular season

Finalstandings

Game log

Regular season
Reference:

Playoffs

Transactions

Trades

Entry Draft
The 2014 NLL Entry Draft took place on September 22, 2014. The Rush made the following selections:

Roster

See also
2015 NLL season

References

Edmonton Rush
Edmonton Rush seasons
Edmonton Rush